Pike Township is one of the fourteen townships of Madison County, Ohio, United States.  The 2000 census found 531 people in the township.

Geography
Located in the northwestern corner of the county, it borders the following townships:
Union Township, Union County - north
Darby Township, Union County - northeast
Darby Township - east
Monroe Township - south
Somerford Township - southwest
Goshen Township, Champaign County - west

No municipalities are located in Pike Township, although the unincorporated community of Rosedale lies in the township's center.

Name and history
It is one of eight Pike Townships statewide.

Government
The township is governed by a three-member board of trustees, who are elected in November of odd-numbered years to a four-year term beginning on the following January 1. Two are elected in the year after the presidential election and one is elected in the year before it. There is also an elected township fiscal officer, who serves a four-year term beginning on April 1 of the year after the election, which is held in November of the year before the presidential election. Vacancies in the fiscal officership or on the board of trustees are filled by the remaining trustees.

References

External links
County website

Townships in Madison County, Ohio
Townships in Ohio